The first officer of the National Assembly of Hungary is the deputy of the Speaker of the National Assembly of Hungary. The current First Officer is Márta Mátrai.

First officers of the National Assembly of Hungary

Since 2013 

 
Lists of legislative speakers in Hungary